Electryone may refer to:
Electryone, a daughter of Helios
Electryone, a patronymic for Alcmene a daughter of Electryon and the mother of Heracles